Paraph may refer to:
 Paraph, a flourish at the end of a signature
 Paraph, an alternative name for the pilcrow sign ¶
Paraphs, a 1928 book by Hermann Püterschein illustrated by William Addison Dwiggins

See also

Paragraph